Red Harvest (1929) is a novel by Dashiell Hammett. The story is narrated by the Continental Op, a frequent character in Hammett's fiction, much of which is drawn from his own experiences as an operative of the Pinkerton Detective Agency (fictionalized as the Continental Detective Agency). The plot follows the Op's investigation of several murders amid a labor dispute in a corrupt Montana mining town. Some of the novel was inspired by the Anaconda Road massacre, a 1920 labor dispute in the mining town of Butte, Montana.

Time included Red Harvest in its 100 Best English-Language Novels from 1923 to 2005, noting that, in the Continental Op, Hammett "created the prototype for every sleuth who would ever be called 'hard-boiled.'" The Nobel Prize-winning author André Gide called the book "a remarkable achievement, the last word in atrocity, cynicism, and horror."

Plot 
The Continental Op is called to Personville (known as "Poisonville" to the locals) by the newspaper publisher Donald Willsson, who is murdered before the Op has a chance to meet with him. The Op begins to investigate Willsson's murder and meets with Willsson's father, Elihu Willsson, a local industrialist who has found his control of the city threatened by several competing gangs. Elihu had originally invited those gangs into Personville to help him impose and then enforce the end of a labor dispute.

The Op extracts a promise and a signed letter from Elihu that pays the Continental Detective Agency, the Op's employer, $10,000 in exchange for cleaning up the city and ridding it of the gangs. When the Op solves Donald's murder, Elihu tries to renege on the deal, but the Op will not allow him to do so.

In the meantime, the Op is spending time with Dinah Brand, a possible love interest of the late Donald Willsson and a moll for Max "Whisper" Thaler, a local gangster. Using information from Brand and Personville's crooked chief of police, Noonan, the Op manages to extract and spread incriminating information to all of the warring parties. When the Op reveals that a bank robbery was staged by the cops and one of the mobs to discredit another mob, a gang war erupts.

The Op wakes up the next morning, though, to find Brand stabbed to death with the ice pick the Op handled the previous evening. No signs of forced entry are visible. The Op becomes a suspect sought by the police for Brand's murder, and one of his fellow operatives, Dick Foley, leaves Personville because he is uncertain of the Op's innocence.

The Op, now wanted by the police, entices Reno Starkey, a gang lieutenant, to take on the last strong rival mob, led by Pete the Finn. The last gangs are whittled down by pipe bombs, arson, gun fights, and corrupt cops gunning down the survivors.

The Op tracks down Starkey, the only gang leader still alive. Starkey is bleeding from four gunshot wounds, having just killed mobster Whisper Thaler. Starkey reveals that he was the one who stabbed Brand, and that she had colluded with the semiconscious Op so he looked like the culprit.

The corrupt police chief Noonan and the gang leaders are all dead. The Op blackmails Elihu Willsson into calling the governor, who sends in the National Guard, declares martial law, and suspends the entire police force. Elihu Willsson gets back his town, as promised, although not in the way that he had anticipated. The Op returns to San Francisco, where the Old Man (the chief of the Continental Detective Agency's office) gives him "merry hell" for his activities.

Serial publication 
Red Harvest was originally serialized in four installments in the pulp magazine Black Mask: 
Part 1: "The Cleansing of Poisonville", Black Mask, November 1927
Part 2: "Crime Wanted—Male or Female", Black Mask, December 1927
Part 3: "Dynamite", Black Mask, January 1928
Part 4: "The 19th Murder", Black Mask, February 1928

Characters 

 "The Continental Op", an operative from the San Francisco branch of the Continental Detective Agency
 Mickey Linehan, a detective from the Continental
 Dick Foley, a detective from the Continental
 The Old Man, boss of the San Francisco branch of the Continental
 Elihu Willsson, "Czar of Poisonville"
 Donald Willsson, newspaper publisher and Elihu's son
 Mrs. Willsson, Donald's wife
 Lewis, Donald's assistant
 Noonan, the corrupt chief of police
 Tim Noonan, the dead brother of Chief Noonan
 Max Thaler, alias "Whisper," a gambler
 Dinah Brand, Thaler's girlfriend
 Dan Rolff, Dinah's roommate and a "lunger"
 Lew Yard, gangster
 Pete the Finn, bootlegger
 Reno Starkey, professional thief
 Hank O'Mara, member of Starkey's gang
 Bill Quint, an organizer for the IWW
 Robert Albury, bank teller
 Helen Albury, Robert's younger sister
 Charles Procter Dawn, criminal lawyer
 Bob MacSwain, murderer of Tim Noonan

Adaptations 
Film critics David Desser and Manny Farber, among others, have noted similarities between Red Harvest and the 1961 film Yojimbo, directed by Akira Kurosawa. Other scholars, such as Donald Richie, believe the similarities are coincidental. Kurosawa said that a major source for Yojimbo  was the film noir classic The Glass Key (1942), an adaption of Hammett's 1931 novel of the same name. In Red Harvest, The Glass Key, and Yojimbo, corrupt officials and businessmen stand behind and profit from the rule of gangsters. Other films based on Yojimbo include Sergio Leone's A Fistful of Dollars and Walter Hill's Last Man Standing.

In the early 1970s, Italian director Bernardo Bertolucci considered filming an adaptation of Red Harvest and wrote a first draft infused with political themes typical of his work. A short while after, he wrote a second draft that was more faithful to Hammett's story. For the role of the Op he considered Robert Redford, Jack Nicholson (who had played a hard-boiled detective in Roman Polanski's neo-noir film Chinatown), and Clint Eastwood (who had played the Op-inspired "Man with No Name" in Sergio Leone's Dollars Trilogy). At some point, Bertolucci discussed this project with Warren Beatty in Rome. In 1982, Bertolucci moved to Los Angeles to begin production, but the project was shelved.

In popular culture

Film
While Akira Kurosawa stated that a major source for the plot for Yojimbo was the 1942 classic The Glass Key, an adaptation of Hammett's's 1931 novel The Glass Key, it has been noted by some critics that the overall plot of Yojimbo is closer to that of Hammett's Red Harvest.

The Coen brothers' film Blood Simple (1984) takes its title from a line in Red Harvest in which the Op tells Brand the escalating violence has affected his mental state: "This damned burg's getting me. If I don't get away soon, I'll be going blood-simple like the natives." The Coens' film Miller's Crossing (1990) employs stylistic and narrative elements of Hammett's Red Harvest, The Glass Key,  and several of Hammett's shorter works. 

The dialogue and plot of director Rian Johnson's debut feature, Brick, was inspired by the novels of Dashiell Hammett, particularly Red Harvest.

Literature
Science-fiction writer David Drake has said that he took the plot of his novel The Sharp End (1993) from Red Harvest.

Television
In The Aurora Teagarden Mysteries Season 1 episode 10, "A Game of Cat and Mouse", Red Harvest is quoted as is The Maltese Falcon.

Further reading

References

External links
 
 https://www.imdb.com/list/ls063177664/ Complete Guide to Red Harvest/Yojimbo Adaptations/Remakes

1929 American novels
Alfred A. Knopf books
American detective novels
Hardboiled crime novels
Novels by Dashiell Hammett
Works originally published in Black Mask (magazine)
Gun violence in fiction